Sick! (stylized in all caps) is the fourth studio album by American rapper Earl Sweatshirt. It was released on January 14, 2022, through Tan Cressida and Warner Records. The album features collaborations with Armand Hammer and Zelooperz, along with additional vocals by Na-Kel Smith. Production was handled by the Alchemist, Black Noi$e, Navy Blue (under the alias Ancestors), Samiyam, Alexander Spit, Theravada, Rob Chambers, and some co-production by Earl himself. It was preceded by the singles "2010", "Tabula Rasa" featuring Armand Hammer, and "Titanic".

Background
Earl Sweatshirt called the album his "humble offering of 10 songs recorded in the wake of the worldwide coronavirus pandemic and its subsequent lockdowns", as he "leaned into the chaos" of the world's growing "anger and restlessness". The album was announced on December 10, 2021.

Cover art
The album cover depicts a framed mold of Earl Sweatshirt wearing a mask surrounded by two pills, African photos, a clove of garlic, and some sage.

Critical reception

Sick was met with widespread critical acclaim from critics upon its release. At Metacritic, which assigns a normalized rating out of 100 to reviews from mainstream publications, the album received an average score of 85, based on 17 reviews. Aggregator AnyDecentMusic? gave it 7.9 out of 10, based on their assessment of the critical consensus.

Tom Breihan of Stereogum named Sick! "Album of the Week", stating, "SICK! is the first Earl Sweatshirt album that doesn't sound more freaked-out and withdrawn than the one that came before. It's a dense, rich, contemplative piece of work... [it's] a strange and insular rap record, but it's a rap record nonetheless, and it's a great one". Concluding the review for AllMusic, Fred Thomas felt that while " Sick! is brief, with just ten songs clocking in at around 24 minutes, but every move is placed with intention and forethought. Sharp, direct, and fluid in a way that's almost supernatural, Sick! perfectly conveys the duality of frustration and drive to persevere that arises from living through exceptionally difficult times." Reviewing the album for Pitchfork, Dylan Green compared the album to its predecessor; "Sick! doesn't recontextualize the genre in the same way Some Rap Songs did, but it's an act of self-revolution. It magnifies a newly assured Earl Sweatshirt, skin shed and free to ascend."

Track listing

Notes
  signifies a recording engineer.
 "Titanic" features additional vocals by Na-Kel Smith.

Charts

References

2022 albums
Albums produced by the Alchemist (musician)
Earl Sweatshirt albums
Warner Records albums